Henry Osborne Havemeyer (October 18, 1847 – December 4, 1907) was an American industrialist, entrepreneur and sugar refiner who founded and became president of the American Sugar Refining Company in 1891.

Havemeyer was the third generation of his family in the sugar business and oversaw the expansion of the family firm into the American Sugar Refining Company, which dominated the sugar industry in the late 19th century. Together with his wife, Louisine Havemeyer, he was an avid and prolific collector of art, one of the earliest collectors to bring Impressionist art to America, guided by artist Mary Cassatt. After Louisine Havemeyer's death in 1929, a large part of their collection was bequeathed to the Metropolitan Museum of Art.

Early life 
Henry Osborne Havemeyer was born in New York City on October 18, 1847, the eighth of nine children, to Frederick Christian Havemeyer Jr. (1807-1891) and Sarah Louise ( Henderson) Havemeyer (1812-1851). His mother died in 1851 when Harry, as he was known to his family, was three years old. He was raised with the help of his grandmothers, Mary Osborne Henderson and Catharine Billiger Havemeyer, and his oldest sister, Mary Havemeyer. The family lived in a house at 193 West 14th Street, in what was then the northern frontier of New York City. 

In 1854, Harry Havemeyer, age seven, and his brother Thomas, age nine, were sent to study at the Bellport Academy in Long Island, under the charge of Mr. James Cruikshank. The following year, Harry followed his older brother Theodore to Mr. Betts' School in Stamford, Connecticut. He was a difficult, short-tempered student. After a fight with the principal, he left the school. His formal schooling ended at the age of eight.

Sugar refining

Havemeyers in the sugar industry (1799–1842) 
In 1799, William Havemeyer (1770-1851) arrived in New York City, followed three years later by his younger brother Frederick Christian Havemeyer (1774-1841). The brothers came from a family of bakers in Bückeburg, Germany, and trained in London during the last decades of the 18th century. William Havemeyer was brought to New York under contract to Edmund Seaman to run his sugar bakery on Pine Street. Frederick followed circa 1802, and in 1805 the brothers leased land from Trinity Church on Budd Street (later renamed Vandam Street) to build their own sugar bakery, which opened in 1807. 

After the Havemeyer brothers retired in 1828, their respective sons, cousins William F. Havemeyer (1804-1874) and Frederick C. Havemeyer Jr. (1807-1891), took over the Havemeyer family business. In 1842, William F. Havemeyer began a political career, serving three terms as Mayor of New York City. In 1856 Frederick C. Havemeyer Jr. moved the business to Williamsburg, Brooklyn leasing a waterfront lot between South 3rd and South 4th Streets on which to establish a steam sugar refinery. In 1861, eldest son George W. Havemeyer, age 22, became partner, but died on November 27, 1861, when his clothes were caught in the crank of one of the refinery's large engines. In 1863, Frederick C. Havemeyer Jr. reorganized the business as Havemeyers & Elder, a partnership with son Theodore A. Havemeyer in charge of refinery operations and son-in-law J. Lawrence Elder in charge of the mercantile business.

Havemeyers & Elder (1863–1882) 
When the partnership of Havemeyers & Elder was formed in 1863, Henry Osborne Havemeyer, known in the business as H.O. Havemeyer, was a fifteen-year-old apprentice and, in the family tradition, was learning his way through all aspects of the business from testing sugar at the docks to learning the complex processes of refinery operations, including the carefully guarded secrets of sugar boiling. Subsequently, he became apprentice to J. Lawrence Elder, working on the mercantile aspect of the business—purchasing, sales and record keeping. When Elder died suddenly in 1868, H.O. Havemeyer and his brother Thomas took over the mercantile business and became partners in Havemeyers & Elder in 1869. Cousin Charles H. Senff also joined the partnership to manage refinery operations and construction with Theodore A. Havemeyer. 

By 1868, the Havemeyers & Elder refinery had doubled in size. Known as the Yellow Sugar House, it covered the blocks on the East River waterfront from South 2nd Street to South 5th Street. Modern innovations were introduced into refinery operations, such that sugar was refined with great efficiency. By 1876 Thomas Havemeyer was no longer involved in Havemeyers & Elder, and H.O. Havemeyer became the principal partner in charge of the mercantile business.

Refinery fire and rebuilding (1882–1884) 
On Sunday, January 8, 1882, the Havemeyers & Elder refinery was completely destroyed by fire, a loss of $1.5 million. 

The partners, Theodore, H. O. and Frederick C. Havemeyer Jr. and cousin Charles H. Senff, agreed to rebuild and constructed a large state-of-the-art refinery, the cost of which required the entire financial resources of the family, including Frederick C. Havemeyer Jr.'s personal fortune. 

The new refinery was designed by Theodore A. Havemeyer, Charles H. Senff and refinery superintendent Ernest Gerbracht. It was built of completely fireproof materials—brick and iron, with cast iron columns and wrought iron beams and girders. Electric lights were installed, a new technology that was less hazardous than gas lights. The refinery reopened for business in January 1884 with a capacity to refine three million pounds of sugar daily.

Formation of the Sugar Trust (1887–1891) 
In 1887 H.O. Havemeyer established the Sugar Refineries Company, known as the Sugar Trust. The late 1870s and 1880s were a time of intense competition in sugar refining, in which the growth of the industry after the Civil War led to overproduction and slim profit margins. Large refineries, such as Havemeyers & Elder, were producing sugar so efficiently and at such great quantity that supply outstripped demand. Refineries were unable to operate at full capacity and many smaller, less efficient refineries failed. In the face of these harsh conditions, the sugar refiners sought to organize in order to control production and pricing. On October 27, 1887, after two years of negotiations, an agreement was reached to combine into a "trust," called the Sugar Refineries Company.
 By year end the Sugar Trust included 17 of the 23 refinery companies operating in the United States. A competition between the company's refineries followed to determine which were most efficient and would remain in operation. By 1890 five refineries remained in operation, with Havemeyers & Elder as the sole New York area refinery.

The legality of the Sugar Trust came before the New York State court in a November 1890 suit, People of the State of New York versus the North River Refining Company.
 This led the Sugar Trust to reorganize as a holding company, the American Sugar Refining Company, which was incorporated in New Jersey on January 10, 1891, by attorneys Elihu Root and John Randolph Dos Passos. Effectively the business practices of the American Sugar Refining Company maintained those of the Sugar Refineries Company and it continued to be known as the Sugar Trust.

Acquisition of refineries (1887–1895) 
In 1887 Havemeyer sought to bring the remaining independent refineries into the Trust. His chief rival on the West Coast was Claus Spreckels, who refused to join the Trust. Using a small California plant that the Sugar Trust had acquired in 1891, Havemeyer began an aggressive price war to put Spreckels out of business. In retaliation Spreckels opened a Philadelphia refinery in 1889, intending to undercut the Trust's business in the East. A fierce price war continued for two years, until the Trust and Spreckels came to an agreement in 1891: Spreckels sold his Philadelphia refinery to the Trust and the two sides agreed to keep out of each other's territory.

The years 1889-1892 were a severely competitive time for the Trust, where the margin between the cost of raw sugar and the price of refined sugar was at its lowest. Alleviation of conditions came when the McKinley Act of 1890 eliminated import duties on raw sugar. Consequently, prices of refined sugar dropped and there resulted an increase in sugar consumption. In spite of intense competition from Spreckels, the Trust saw profits increase, distributed large dividends, and continued to expand.

In 1891 Havemeyer moved to acquire the remaining three Philadelphia refineries. The acquisition of E.C. Knight Company, one of the Philadelphia refineries, was challenged by the U. S. government in the landmark case, United States v. E. C. Knight Co.. In 1895, the Supreme Court ruled in favor of the Sugar Trust, on the grounds that sugar refining was manufacture, not interstate commerce, and was therefore not under the jurisdiction of the federal government, nor covered by the Sherman Antitrust Act.

Arbuckle Sugar and Coffee War 1898-1901 
In 1898, John Arbuckle, a coffee merchant and wholesale grocer from Pittsburgh, head of the Coffee Trust, entered the sugar market. Arbuckle coated his beans in a mixture of Irish Moss, Isinglass, Gelatine, Sugar and Eggs to preserve flavor which also enriched the coffee. 

Arbuckle had innovated in the automated packaging of his coffee beans and began to repackage sugar, which he bought from the Sugar Trust, to sell alongside his coffee beans. Arbuckle moved to produce his own sugar and built a refinery in Brooklyn. Thereafter Havemeyer and Arbuckle entered into a fierce competition. Havemeyer bought controlling interest in a coffee business, Woolson Spice Company of Toledo, Ohio, in order to undercut Arbuckle's prices. Arbuckle retaliated by lowering prices on the sugar produced at his new refinery. The price war continued for three years. In 1901 the two men came to an agreement to end their costly war.

Congressional investigations 
On June 12, 1894 H.O. Havemeyer testified before a special committee of senators appointed to investigate the Sugar Trust. He admitted to lobbying on behalf of his interests, which he claimed was within his rights and was common practice. A request was made by a senator to review all the political contributions made by the American Sugar Refining Company in 1892–1893. After seeking counsel, at his next appearance before the committee, Havemeyer declined to submit his company's books for examination or to answer any further questions. In 1897 Havemeyer was brought to trial for contempt of court for refusing to answer the questions put to him by a committee of the United States Senate investigating the amount of donations his company had made to national and state political campaigns in 1892 and 1893. He was found not guilty and the indictment was dismissed.

National Sugar Refining Company of New Jersey (1900) 
As a result of the Arbuckle price war, the few independent refineries that were built in the 1890s began to experience financial difficulties. Taking advantage of this, H.O. Havemeyer moved to acquire the remaining independent firms: the Mollenhauers Refinery in Brooklyn, National Sugar Company in Yonkers, and New York Refining Company in Long Island City. He did so anonymously, using James H. Post, partner in the independent sugar broker firm B. H. Howell, Son & Company. The three refineries were consolidated into the National Sugar Refining Company of New Jersey, with James H. Post as president and B.H. Howell, Son & Company handling the mercantile side of the business. On May 31, 1900, the National Sugar Refining Company of New Jersey was incorporated in New Jersey. Although independent of the Sugar Trust, the American Sugar Refining Company owned half its stock and the National received preferential treatment from the Sugar Trust.

Expanding west (1902) 
After the turn of the century, Havemeyer expanded the Sugar Trust's holdings to the sugar beet industry in the West. In 1902, he consolidated four small Utah factories into the Amalgamated Sugar Company. Also that year, working with the Church of Jesus Christ of Latter-day Saints (LDS Church), he revitalized the Utah-Idaho Sugar Company. In 1905 he consolidated a group of small sugar factories in Colorado into the Great Western Sugar Company. The Sugar Trust also acquired an interest in the Michigan Sugar Company, the Continental Sugar Company and a half-interest in Spreckels Beet Sugar Company of California.

Expanding south (1906) 
In 1892, Havemeyer made his first investment in Cuban raw sugar by investing in the Trinidad Sugar Company along with Charles H. Senff and Edwin Atkins. In 1906, he formed the Cuban American Sugar company, centralizing the management of five Cuban raw sugar manufacturers.

Customs fraud 1907 
In November 1907, two weeks before Havemeyer's death, a raid of the docks at the Havemeyer plant in Brooklyn by the U.S. Treasury Department revealed that the scales that were used to weigh incoming raw sugar had been tampered with and the firm had underpaid import duties. Two United States special customs agents, Richard Parr and James O. Brzezinski, tipped off by a disgruntled employee, discovered a concealed spring inserted into the scale which permitted the checker to exert pressure so as to reduce the weight. The criminal case against the American Sugar Refining Company was brought to federal court in New York in 1908 by District Attorney Henry L. Stimson and Felix Frankfurter, and was won by the government in 1909. 

A civil suit followed to collect custom duties owed to the government. To avoid further litigation and bad publicity, the American Sugar Refining Company agreed to settle the customs fraud case for $2 million in back payment. Individual officers of the American Sugar Refining Company were tried separately for criminal involvement. In 1909 dock foreman Oliver Spitzer was convicted for attempted bribery. Ernest Gerbracht, superintendent, and Charles R. Heike, secretary, and five company checkers were also convicted.

Personal and family life 
In March 1870, Havemeyer was married to Mary Louise Elder. Mary Louise, known as Louise, was the sister of his brother-in-law, J. Lawrence Elder. It was a short and unhappy marriage. They were divorced in 1882, with no children.

On August 22, 1883, Havemeyer married for the second time to 28-year-old Louisine W. Elder, the daughter of George W. Elder and Matilda Waldron Elder. Together, Henry and Louisine were the parents of three children:

 Adaline Havemeyer (1884–1963), married to banker Peter Hood Ballantine Frelinghuysen I in 1907.
 Horace Havemeyer (1886–1956), married to debutante Doris A. Dick, a daughter of J. Henry Dick.
 Electra Havemeyer (1888–1960), married to polo champion and insurance executive James Watson Webb II, a grandson of William H. Vanderbilt and James Watson Webb, in 1910.

Although each of the children collected art in their own right, Electra Havemeyer Webb collected on the grand scale of her parents and went on to found Shelburne Museum to showcase her deep and diverse collections.

Musical interests 
H.O. Havemeyer was an amateur violinist. He was a student of noted violinist Frederick Mollenhauer. It was his daily recreation and he would frequently play for three hours a day. H.O. and Louisine Havemeyer held regular Sunday musicales at their home at 1 East 66th Street.

Henry Osborne and other members of the family were major collectors of instruments. Some of the most important instruments they collectively owned were two violins: the 1723 Stradivari 'Kiesewette' (played by Maxim Vengerov, Ilya Gringolts, Stefan Jackiw, Philippe Quint and most recently Augustin Hadelich), 1737 Guarneri 'del Gesù' "King Joseph", and three cellos: 1711 Stradivari "Duport" (ex-Rostropovich), 1714 Stradivari "Batta" (ex-Piatigorsky and most recently on loan to the Metropolitan Museum of Art) and the 1743 Guadagnini "Havemeyer".

Art collecting and Patronage 

H.O. Havemeyer's first art purchases were made during his visit in 1876 to the Centennial Exhibition in Philadelphia with Samuel Colman. He bought carved ivory figures, Japanese lacquered boxes, silk, brocades, and sword guards. Typically his purchases were impulsive, numerous, and deeply personal. Both H.O. and Louisine had distinct tastes for art collecting that largely complemented each other. Both H.O. and Louisine had to be in agreement as to an object's worth for it to enter their now legendary collection. Louisine focused on collecting modern works by European painters, including the then-unappreciated Impressionists. She was most influenced by her close friend Mary Cassatt, who encouraged her to buy works by Edgar Degas and Claude Monet.  Louisine would make 33 transatlantic crossings, returning from each major trip with a bounty of great western art.

In her will, Louisine identified some 142 works as a bequest to the Metropolitan Museum of Art, and empowered her children to give the museum's curators free rein. By the time they had finished an inventory of the Havemeyer's three-story Fifth Avenue home 1,967 works would be assimilated into the Met's holdings, identified as the H.O. Havemeyer Collection. The Havemeyer collection is represented throughout the galleries, but notably by the sheer volume of works present in the Impressionist collection. Some choice works from the Havemeyer collection are on view at the Shelburne Museum and the University of Michigan Museum of Art.

Homes

Hilltop, Greenwich, CT 
In 1889 H.O. Havemeyer purchased 90 acres on Palmer Hill Road in Greenwich, Connecticut, on which to build a country home. The parcel had been owned by the Palmer and Quintard families for many generations, and was located to the north of Boston Post Road, east of the Mianus River, including  200 virgin acres at Mianus Ridge and Valley. The house was called Hilltop and had a view of Long Island Sound. It was designed by Boston firm Peabody and Stearns, three stories high with numerous facades, high gables, and six large chimneys. Samuel Colman designed the interiors and furnishings. Walls were covered with Japanese papers. The dining room was modeled after 17th Century Dutch paintings. The library was the principal room adorned with bookshelves, paintings and musical instruments. Superintendent James Troy managed the property, which included barns for horses, cows and pigs. The stables complemented the architecture of the house. There were three long greenhouses and acres of fruit trees and vegetable gardens. Figs were grown, as were orchids and gardenias. A grapery produced Concord grapes, both purple and light green, which won prizes at the Madison Square Garden flower show. The head gardener was George Morrow.

1 East 66th Street 
In 1889 the Havemeyers purchased land at the corner of 66th Street and Fifth Avenue and hired architect Charles Coolidge Haight (1841-1917) to design a building for their residence. Built in the Romanesque Revival style, the residence was four stories high with a round turreted bay at the corner. To design the interiors of the home, the Havemeyers hired the interior design firm of Louis Comfort Tiffany and Samuel Colman. Construction of the building was complete in 1890; the interiors were finished by 1892. A work of art in their own right, the interiors were designed as a harmonious environment in which to display the Havemeyers collections of Asian art, Islamic pottery, Dutch and Impressionist paintings.

Tiffany and Colman designed every detail of the interior and its furnishings. They were inspired by the exotic cultures of the Near and Far East. Each room was thematically unique and covered with sumptuous materials, such as embroidered silks and Tiffany-designed glass tiles. Many of the materials used, including in the leaded-glass windows, light fixtures, mosaics and balustrades. were fabricated at the Tiffany Glass and Decorating Co., and the interiors displayed Tiffany's "genius as a colorist and a luminist." Islamic-themed mosaics covered the walls of the front hall. Chinese embroidered silk hangings covered the walls of the reception room. Japanese silk brocade panels were assembled by Coleman from the pieces Havemeyer had bought from the Centennial Exhibition in 1876. These fabric panels adorned the ceiling in H.O. Havemeyer's library, which was called the Rembrandt Room as it housed his collection of Dutch paintings. In the music room, where the Sunday musicales were held, walls were hung with Chinese embroideries and lit by a magnificent Tiffany-designed chandelier, inspired by the wildflower Queen Anne's lace and made of clusters of opalescent blown-glass balls. The most spectacular element of the home was the flying staircase, inspired by that of Venice's Doge's Palace. It connected a balcony that circled the upper half of the two-story picture gallery to the room below. Suspended from the ceiling by sparkling chains and fringed with crystal, the stairs floated on a curved piece of cast iron and would tinkle when crossed. The house was torn down after Louisine Havemeyer's death in 1929. Some parts of the house are in the collection of the University of Michigan Museum of Art.

The carriage house and stables were located at 126 East 66th Street, west of Third Avenue, designed in 1895 by H.O. Havemeyer's cousin William J. Wallace and S.E. Gage and later owned by John Hay Whitney.

Islip, Long Island 
The Havemeyers spent the months of July and August in Islip, Long Island, where H.O. Havemeyer sailed on the Great South Bay. In 1890 they bought property on St. Mark's Lane in Islip, Long Island, next door to Louisine Havemeyer's sister and brother-in-law, Adaline and Samuel T. Peters. In 1900 the Havemeyers moved into the Bayberry Point community that H.O. had developed, occupying the southwesterly house. Havemeyer owned a Herreshoff 30 named Electra which he raced in the Great South Bay.

Merrivale Farm, Commack, Long Island 
Havemeyer purchased 500 acres in Commack, Long Island, neighboring the racetrack of Carll S. Burr, who was engaged in breeding and training of trotting horses. Havemeyer was an avid hunter of ducks and other game birds. He owned a large stable of trotting horses and established a pheasant shooting preserve on land nearby.

Philanthropy 
Havemeyer was a trustee of the American Museum of Natural History He and his brothers gave Havemeyer Hall for a School of Mines to Columbia University as a memorial for their father Frederick C. Havemeyer Jr. who studied at Columbia College from 1821 to 1823.  Havemeyer gave a school to the Town of Greenwich, Connecticut.

Death 
H.O. Havemeyer died on December 4, 1907, at Merrivale Farm in Commack, Long Island, after a sudden illness. He was at Merrivale Farm with his son Horace for a Thanksgiving visit to shoot pheasant; his wife Louisine remained in New York City to be by her dying mother's bedside. After Thanksgiving lunch, Havemeyer was stricken with acute indigestion. The local doctor was called, but could not help. His wife and daughter Electra arrived the next morning with three New York City doctors; however, Havemeyer was beyond help. He lived for five days before dying at 3 p.m. on December 4. The cause of death is thought to be peritonitis, as a consequence of undetermined digestive failure, and subsequent kidney failure. Funeral services were held at his home at 1 East 66th Street officiated by Rev. Dr. R. Heber Newton, an Episcopalian minister. Havemeyer was buried at Green-Wood Cemetery.

See also
 Havemeyer family
 Havemeyer

References

Bibliography

External links 
 Online Biography 
 
  The Havemeyer Family Papers relating to Art Collecting in The Metropolitan Museum of Art Archives. 
 Online edition of Frits Lugt's Les marques de collection de dessins & d'estampes
The H. O. Havemeyer Collection, a collection catalog from The Metropolitan Museum of Art Libraries

American food company founders
American art collectors
Businesspeople in the sugar industry
1847 births
1907 deaths
Henry
Burials at Green-Wood Cemetery
American people of German descent
People from Islip (town), New York
People from Commack, New York
People from Mahwah, New Jersey
American sugar industry
Trust Company of America people